Granite Hills High School, established in 1999, is the one of the eleven high schools in Porterville, Tulare County, California. The last principal op million finalist in the National Scholastic Press Association Pacemaker Competition in the 2005–06 school year and were winners the following two years.

The Granite Hills Academic Decathlon team won the Tulare County Academic Decathlon Regional Championship for the 6th consecutive year.

External links 
Granite Hills High School Webpage
Granite Hills High School Online Newspaper, the Grizzly Gazette

High schools in Tulare County, California
Public high schools in California
Porterville, California
1999 establishments in California